Medina Municipal Airport is a public use airport in Medina County, Ohio, United States. It is owned by the City of Medina and is located four nautical miles (7.41 km) east of the central business district. According to the FAA's National Plan of Integrated Airport Systems for 2007-2011, it is categorized as a reliever airport.

Although most U.S. airports use the same three-letter location identifier for the FAA and IATA, this airport is assigned 1G5 by the FAA but has no designation from the IATA.

Facilities and aircraft 
It has two asphalt runways designated 01/19, with a surface measuring 2,867 by 60 feet (874 x 18 m) and 09/27, with a surface measuring 3,556 by 75 feet (1,084 x 23 m).

For the 12-month period ending July 18, 2008, the airport had 79,685 aircraft operations, an average of 218 per day: 98% general aviation, 2% air taxi, and a few military and ultralight. At that time there were 65 aircraft based at this airport: 80% single-engine, 11% multi-engine, 3% helicopter and 6% ultralight.

References

External links 
 Aerial photo as of 12 October 2000 from USGS The National Map
 

Airports in Ohio
Buildings and structures in Medina County, Ohio
Transportation in Medina County, Ohio